Crinum asiaticum, commonly known as poison bulb, giant crinum lily, grand crinum lily, or spider lily, is a plant species widely planted in many warmer regions as an ornamental. It is a bulb-forming perennial producing an umbel of large, showy flowers that are prized by gardeners. However, all parts of the plant are poisonous if ingested. Some reports indicate exposure to the sap may cause skin irritation.

C. asiaticum is native to Indian Ocean islands, East Asia, tropical Asia, Australia and Pacific islands. It is regarded as naturalized in Mexico, the West Indies, Florida, Suriname, Louisiana, numerous Pacific islands, Madagascar and the Chagos Archipelago.

Description

It has a leaf base. Its pseudobulb is spherical. The upper part of the bulb is cylindrical. The base is laterally branched, with a diameter of about 6–15 cm. Its leaves are lanceolate, margin undulate, apically acuminate. They feature 1 sharp point and are dark green, growing up to 1 m long. Their width is 7–12 cm or wider and they number 20-30. The inflorescence is an umbel with 10-24 flowers, six petaloid tepals, and aromatic. The flower stem is erect, as long as the leaf, and solid. The spathe is lanceolate, membranous, and 6–10 cm. The bractlet liner is 3–7 cm. Its perianth tube is slender and straight, green white, 7–10 cm, diameter 1.5–2 mm. The corolla is spider-like shaped, white, linear, revolute, attenuate, 4.5–9 cm long, and 6–9 mm wide. The corolla is 6-lobed. The pedicel is ca 0.5-2.5 cm long. It has 6 reddish stamens. The filaments are 4–5 cm long. The anthers are liner, attenuate, ca. 1.5 cm long or more. The ovary is fusiform, and up to 2 cm long. The fruit is an oblate capsule, green, and 3–5 cm in diameter. The seeds are large, and the exotesta is spongy.

Toxicity
The entire plant is toxic, especially the bulb. It contains a variety of alkaloids such as lycorine and tazettine. When eaten, it can cause vomiting, abdominal pain, severe diarrhea, constipation, irregular breathing, rapid pulse, fever, etc.; sufficient misuse can cause nervous system paralysis and death.

Use
The Tao people indigenous to Taiwan's Orchid Island uses slices of its stem (known as vakong) tied to a heavy object to bait fish going into their nets. The Paiwan and Puyuma peoples use this plant (livakong) as a natural boundary plant.

References

asiaticum
Flora of China
Flora of the Indian subcontinent
Flora of Korea
Flora of Japan
Flora of Indo-China
Flora of the Southwestern Pacific
Flora of Malesia
Flora of Papuasia
Flora of Taiwan
Flora of Seychelles
Flora of Mauritius
Flora of Christmas Island
Flora of the Bonin Islands
Flora of the Ryukyu Islands
Plants described in 1753
Taxa named by Carl Linnaeus